Daniel Read Anthony Jr. (August 22, 1870 – August 4, 1931) was an American Republican politician and a nephew of suffragist and political leader Susan B. Anthony.

He is the son of newspaper publisher Daniel Read Anthony. He was born in Leavenworth, Kansas, on August 22, 1870; attended the public schools as well as the Michigan Military Academy at Orchard Lake, Michigan; enrolled at the University of Michigan at Ann Arbor; studied law; was admitted to the bar, but did not practice extensively; engaged in newspaper work; appointed postmaster of Leavenworth, Kansas, on June 22, 1898, and served until June 30, 1902, when a successor was appointed; Mayor of Leavenworth, 1903–1905; became manager and editor of the Leavenworth Times in 1904.

He was elected as a Republican to House of Representatives of the 60th Congress to fill the vacancy caused by the resignation from body of Charles Curtis—who was elevated to the Senate; Anthony was re-elected in this capacity to the nine succeeding Congresses and served in the House from May 23, 1907 to March 3, 1929; well known for co-introducing along with Senator Curtis in December 1923 the first rendition of the proposed Equal Rights Amendment to the United States Constitution; Chairman, Committee on Appropriations in the House during the 70th Congress; was not a candidate for renomination in 1928; resumed his former business pursuits; died in Leavenworth on August 4, 1931; interment in Mount Muncie Cemetery.

References

External links

1870 births
1931 deaths
Mayors of places in Kansas
Politicians from Leavenworth, Kansas
University of Michigan alumni
Republican Party members of the United States House of Representatives from Kansas
20th-century American politicians